Ripley's Believe It or Not! is a television series hosted and executive produced by Bruce Campbell and based on the franchise of the same name. It was produced by Texas Crew Productions and aired for one season on the Travel Channel from June 9 to August 4, 2019.

Episodes

References

External links
 

Ripley's Believe It or Not! television series
American non-fiction television series
2010s American television series
2019 American television series debuts
2019 American television series endings
Travel Channel original programming